Ed Wasser (born March 26, 1964) is an American actor, best known for his portrayal of Mr. Morden in Babylon 5.

Biography
Wasser was born in Roslyn Heights, New York on March 26, 1964. He obtained a Bachelor of Fine Arts degree from the State University of New York, SUNY Purchase Conservatory. After college he started his own business called Ad Skates, Inc., while continuing acting classes at the Michael Howard Studios.

Career

Acting
He is best known for his portrayal of Mr. Morden in 14 episodes of the US science fiction television series Babylon 5. He also appeared in the pilot telefilm of the series, but as a different character ("Guerra", part of the operations staff in the Babylon 5 Observation Dome).

Wasser has appeared in numerous television series including Quantum Leap, Law & Order, Murder, She Wrote, NYPD Blue, and 24.

He appears in the 1995 film The Set-Up.

Voicework
In 2009, he voiced a robot (IR-2) in the NASA animated short "Robot Astronomy Talk Show: Gravity and the Great Attractor," part of the web-series IRrelevant Astronomy produced by NASA's Spitzer Space Telescope.

Construction
Mainly retired from acting, Wasser founded a construction company called Waterstone Construction and works as a general contractor.

Film

TV appearances

References

External links
 
 

1964 births
Living people
American male television actors
People from Roslyn Heights, New York
Male actors from New York (state)